David Flitwick (1281–1353), of Flitwick, Bedfordshire, was an English politician and soldier of the Anglo-Scots Wars who followed in the footsteps of his grandfather, also David Flitwick.

Life
Flitwick joined Edward I of England in the invasion of Scotland and was made a Knight of the Bath at the Feast of the Swans alongside 266 other men including his brother-in-law William Marmion (a candidate to be the Knight of Norham  Castle and inspiration for Walter Scott's poem "Marmion").

Flitwick was summoned to Parliament for the Bedfordshire constituency on 8 Jul 1313 and again on 23 Sep 1313.

The Inquisition post mortem held in 1353 found Flitwick to have been in possession of the manor of Flitwick in Bedfordshire and another in 1355 determined he also held Brendhall manor in Harlow, Essex and Ringstead (Ringstone?) and Leasingham manors in Lincolnshire and parcels of land at Anwick, Haconby and Killingholme.

Family
Flitwick was succeeded by Eleanor. His sister, Lucy, married William Marmion.

References

English people of the Wars of Scottish Independence
People knighted at the Feast of the Swans
Knights of the Bath
English knights
13th-century English people
English MPs 1313
1281 births
People from Flitwick
1353 deaths